"I Wanna Make You Cry" is a song co-written and recorded by American country music artist Jeff Bates.  It was released in January 2004 as the third single from the album Rainbow Man.  The song reached #23 on the Billboard Hot Country Singles & Tracks chart.  The song was written by Bates and Kenny Beard.

Chart performance

References

2004 singles
2003 songs
Jeff Bates songs
Songs written by Jeff Bates
Songs written by Kenny Beard
Song recordings produced by David Malloy
RCA Records singles